The Sisseton Milbank Railroad (Reporting Mark SMRR) is a railroad subsidiary of the Twin Cities and Western Railroad that operates between its namesake, the cities of Sisseton and Milbank in South Dakota.

The Sisseton Milbank Railroad operates former Dakota Rail trackage, which is a former Chicago, Milwakuee, St. Paul and Pacific Railroad branchline. The railroad mostly ships grain from the elevator in Sisseton to Milbank to be shipped out on the BNSF or Twin Cities and Western Railroad line. They also store rail cars on this line when grain shipments are not needed. Currently the railroad ships about 2,500,000 bushels of grain per year, or a little over 500 carloads annually.

Rebuilding

Work on the rail bridge over Lake Farley, the longest structure on the railroad, received a nearly $1.7 million grant to replace the structure. The work was completed in the fall of 2022.

In the South Dakota state budget proposed by governor Kristi Noem in December 2022, $6,250,000 was proposed as the state's matching contribution to a proposed $24,000,000 Federal Government grant to rebuild the railroad, upgrading from lightweight 75 lb rail rolled as far back as 1884, capable of train speeds of only 3 to 5 miles per hour, with a weight limit of 263,000 lbs, and a limit of 13 loaded rail cars.

References 

South Dakota railroads